Gentilini is an Italian surname. Notable people with the surname include:

Aldo Gentilini, Italian painter
Fernando Gentilini
Franco Gentilini (1909–1981), Italian painter
Giancarlo Gentilini (born 1929), Italian politician and lawyer

Italian-language surnames